Michigan's 32nd Senate district is one of 38 districts in the Michigan Senate. The 32nd district was created by the 1850 Michigan Constitution, as the 1835 constitution only permitted  a maximum of eight senate districts. It has been represented by Republican Jon Bumstead since 2023, succeeding fellow Republican Kenneth Horn.

Geography
District 32 encompasses all of Benzie, Mason, Muskegon, and Oceana counties, as well as part of Manistee County.

2011 Apportionment Plan
District 32, as dictated by the 2011 Apportionment Plan, was based in Saginaw, covering all of Saginaw County and parts of western Genesee County. Other communities in the district include Bridgeport, Buena Vista, Freeland, Shields, Frankenmuth, Flushing, Linden, Saginaw Township, Fenton Township, and Flushing Township.

The district overlapped with Michigan's 4th and 5th congressional districts, and with the 48th, 49th, 51st, 85th, 94th, and 95th districts of the Michigan House of Representatives.

List of senators

Recent election results

2018

2014

Federal and statewide results in District 32

Historical district boundaries

References 

32
Genesee County, Michigan
Saginaw County, Michigan